() are Ainu sagas that form a long rich tradition of oral literature. In older periods, the epics were performed by both men and women; during the 19th and early 20th centuries, when Ainu culture was in decline, women were generally the most skillful performers.

Translation history 
Professor Kyōsuke Kindaichi collected  and translated them into Japanese.

In August 2006, the  reported in its article that Japan's Agency of Cultural Affairs would discontinue funding by fiscal year 2007 of the project to translate and transcribe the  compilations of Imekanu, which consists of 92  stories written in romaji with the tenth story lost and 49 stories left untranslated. It is said that the stoppage was because of Shigeru Kayano's death in May 2006.

In 1999, a multi-national group of educators and translators established "Project U-e-peker" with the intention of making more Ainu folktales available in English. They have produced English versions of two of Kayano's books under the titles The Ainu: A Story of Japan's Original People (Tuttle Publishing 2004) and The Ainu and the Fox (RIC Publications 2006).

Books which relate the epic songs of the Ainu in English include Chiri Yukie's , translated by Sarah M. Strong in 2011 and Benjamin Peterson of Project Okikirmui in 2013, and Songs of Gods, Songs of Humans: The Epic Tradition of the Ainu by Donald L. Philippi. The Project Okikirmui collection contains 13 , while Philippi translates 35 epics, all of them originally recorded by women, the majority by Imekanu. The Ainu epic  is a major example of the  style.

Common themes in  narratives 

Trade 
The trade happens between the Ainu and the Wajin, which refers to the ethnic Japanese. The trade between both sides persisted from the 14th century to the middle of the 19th century. This long-term trade with Wajin becomes a common theme in the  narrative. There are a variety of risks associated with trading activities, including conflicts with foreigners, assaults by inland invading foes, and troubles in Wajin town. The Ainu-Wajin trade began as a friendship trade. However, this relationship changed as Wajin aimed to control and rule Ainu through trade.

There are two story patterns about trade:

 The trade-difficulty pattern. It is about heroes stumbling into a problem in a Wajin town. However, the protagonists manage to overcome those difficulties and become wealthy in the end.
 The trade-murder pattern. It is about heroes getting murdered in a Wajin town.

Both story patterns are about the risk and danger associated with trading. The difference is whether or not the main protagonists can solve these problems. In the first story pattern, the story's ending reveals that all problems are resolved, and the heroes live long lives. They become wealthy and successful. In the second pattern, some of the key characters in story are killed. One hero survives and has the responsibility of carrying on their family line.

Parents' death 
In the epic story, the protagonists lose both parents at a young age. These hero characters in  survive by themselves or through the help of gods in the Ainu culture.

"The Story of a Wolf God Who Saved Pon Otasutunkur and His Son" 
The  "The Story of a Wolf God Who Saved Pon Otasutunkur and His Son" reveals both themes of trade and parents' death. It illustrates the connection between two themes the risks of trade and parents' death.

The protagonist Pon Otastunkur is an orphan. His parents both pass away. He is raised in the village by an old man whose true identity is the wolf god. When Pon Otastunkur is old enough, the wolf god brings him to the Wajin town to conduct trade. The daughter of the Wajin town's ruler falls in love with Pon Otastunku and marries him. They leave Wajin town and return to the village together. One day, people from another village start the battle with Pon Otastunkur to steal his money gained from trading with Wajin. Unfortunately, Pon Otastunkur and his wife both die in this battle. Their son loses both parents and repeats the same destiny as his father. The same wolf god raises the son of Pon Otastunku and brings him to the Wajin town to conduct trade. At the end of the story, they successfully rescue and heal the village from the damage.

Depiction of animals and nature 
 are all narrated in the first person. Some stories describe the world through animal perspectives, such as owls, wolves and foxes. Besides animals, all things in the natural world can deliver their voice in the story, including the rivers, valleys and seas. The first-person narrative of animals and nature shows the Ainu people's powerful imagination.

The observation and creation of nature in literature emerge from their generations of hunting, gathering and fishing experiences in nature. It is very different from Western science's perspective of the natural world, which is distanced and objective. Ainu people first participate in nature and then depict the creatures they see and their living environment. In the  narrative, the repeated rhythmic phrase imitates a cry, scream, gnawing, or slithering of the animal spirits. It also mimics behaviour such as a snake moving through the grass. It is the traditional onomatopoeic presentation of a fox's cry in Ainu culture.

See also 
 Ainu music
 Joik – Sami folk songs
 Rekilaulu – a Finnish "sleigh song"
 Kamuy

Bibliography 
 Philippi Donald L. Songs of Gods, Songs of Humans: The Epic Tradition of the Ainu. University of Tokyo Press, 1979; North Point, 1982. .
 Strong, Sarah M. Ainu Spirits Singing: The Living World of Chiri Yukie's Ainu Shinyōshū. University of Hawaii Press, 2011. .
 Sakata, Minako. "Possibilities of Reality, Variety of Versions: The Historical Consciousness of Ainu Folktales." Oral Tradition, vol. 26 no. 1, 2011. Project MUSE, .
 Yuko, Tsushima, et al. "The Possibility of Imagination in These Islands." Boundary 2, vol. 21, no. 1, 1994, pp. 191–97. JSTOR, .
 Strong, Sarah M. "The Most Revered of Foxes: Knowledge of Animals and Animal Power in an Ainu Kamui Yukar." Asian Ethnology, vol. 68, no. 1, 2009, pp. 27–54. JSTOR, http://www.jstor.org/stable/25614520.

References

External links 
 Project U-e-peker2

 
Ainu music
Ainu culture
Epic poetry